Deaux is a small, wooded commune in the Gard department in southern France.

Geography

Climate

Deaux has a hot-summer Mediterranean climate (Köppen climate classification Csa).

See also
Communes of the Gard department

References

Communes of Gard